Radiology is a monthly, peer reviewed, medical journal, owned and published by the Radiological Society of North America. The editor is Linda Moy, MD. The focus of Radiology is imaging research articles in radiology and medical imaging.

Publishing formats
Publishing formats are original research articles (3000 words), research letters (600 words),  technical developments (2000), invited perspectives (2500)  review articles (4500), special report, invited editorial, statements and guidelines (3000), Images in Radiology, Radiology Diagnosis Please, and letter to the editor.

Abstracting and indexing
According to the Journal Citation Reports, Radiology has a 2021 impact factor of 29.146. In addition, the journal is indexed in the following databases:

  Science Citation Index 
  SciSearch 
  Chemical Abstracts
  Current Contents/Clinical Medicine 
  Current Contents/Life Sciences 
  BIOSIS Previews
  Computer & Control Abstracts
  Electrical & Electronics Abstracts
  Physics Abstracts -  Science Abstracts
  CIS Abstracts
  Life Sciences Collection 
  Energy Research Abstracts
  Biological Abstracts
  Chemical Abstracts
  Index Medicus
  International Aerospace Abstracts
  International Nursing Index
  Nuclear Science Abstracts

References

External links
Radiological Society of North America Oak Brook, Illinois

Radiology and medical imaging journals
English-language journals
Publications established in 1923
Monthly journals